Greensburg Cumberland Presbyterian Church, also known as Greensburg Separate Baptist Church, is a history church at Hodgenville Avenue and N. 1st Street in Greensburg, Kentucky.  It was built in 1876 and added to the National Register in 1985.

It was deemed significant for its architecture: "The church is the best of very few
examples in Green County of the Gothic Revival style."

References

Presbyterian churches in Kentucky
Churches on the National Register of Historic Places in Kentucky
Gothic Revival church buildings in Kentucky
Churches completed in 1876
19th-century Presbyterian church buildings in the United States
Cumberland Presbyterian Church
National Register of Historic Places in Green County, Kentucky
1876 establishments in Kentucky
Greensburg, Kentucky